Erosion corrosion is a degradation of material surface due to mechanical action, often by impinging liquid, abrasion by a slurry, particles suspended in fast flowing liquid or gas, bubbles or droplets, cavitation, etc. The mechanism can be described as follows:
 mechanical erosion of the material, or protective (or passive) oxide layer on its surface,
 enhanced corrosion of the material, if the corrosion rate of the material depends on the thickness of the oxide layer.

The mechanism of erosion corrosion, the materials affected by it, and the conditions when it occurs are generally different from that of flow-accelerated corrosion, although the last one is sometimes classified as a sub-type of erosion corrosion.

See also
 Corrosion engineering
 Tribocorrosion
 Tribology
 Wear

References

Further reading
 D. Aylor (2003). Evaluating Erosion Corrosion, Cavitation, and Impingement, Corrosion: Fundamentals, Testing, and Protection, Vol 13A, ASM Handbook, ASM International, p 639–643.
 Alan Levy (1995). "Solid Particle Erosion and Erosion-Corrosion of Materials", ASM International.

Engineering mechanics
Corrosion
Materials degradation